Dilta italica is a species of jumping bristletail in the family Machilidae.

Subspecies
These two subspecies belong to the species Dilta italica:
 Dilta italica almanzorensis Bach, 1971
 Dilta italica italica (Grassi, 1887)

References

Further reading

 
 
 

Archaeognatha
Articles created by Qbugbot
Insects described in 1887